Arshaluys Poghos Tarverdyan (born 15 October 1945) is an Armenian scientist and author. He has published 152 scientific articles (including 26 describing copyrighted inventions) and five monographs, one of which was published in English in Germany by the Hohenheim University Scientific Council. He has also written two textbooks for engineering speciality students.

Tarverdyan graduated from the faculty of Agricultural Machinery of former Armenian Agriculture Institute in 1968. He has been rector of the Armenian National Agrarian University since 1988 and is the Combined Professor of the Chair of material's resistance.

Tarverdyan has studied architectonical, anatomy-morphological structural principles of stems identifying several patterns that had not previously been observed. These patterns are mostly used for calculating and projecting engineering and machine-building structures and details ensuring required hardness and strangeness at minimum expense.

Tarverdyan has developed eight patented cutting devices. He is a corresponding member of National Academy of Sciences of Armenia.

Scientific acknowledgements and awards
2000 - medal after Anania Shirakatsi
2004 - golden medal from Russian State Agrarian University named after K.A.Timiryazev
2007 - prize and medal after the Socrates
2011 - title of honored scientist on the RA by the decree of the RA President
2011 - medal of Artsakh's Gratitude by the decree of the NKR President

References

1945 births
Living people
Armenian scientists